UQO or Uqo may refer to:

 Université du Québec en Outaouais
 Unquadoctium, an unsynthesized chemical element with atomic number 148 and symbol Uqo